Iñárritu or Iñarritu is a Basque surname. Notable people with the surname include:

Alejandro González Iñárritu (born 1963), Mexican film director, producer and screenwriter
Jon Iñarritu (born 1979), Basque politician
José Alberto Aguilar Iñárritu (born 1954), Mexican economist and politician

Basque-language surnames